Hrísey is a small island off the north coast of Iceland, situated approximately  north of Akureyri, in Eyjafjörður, at .

Since 2004, the island has been a part of the municipality of Akureyri, having previously been a municipality in its own right.

It is the second-largest island off the coast of Iceland (after Heimaey in the Vestmannaeyjar). It has a population of approximately 120 people, and has been continuously inhabited since the Settlement of Iceland. The island is connected to the mainland by a ferry service to Árskógssandur, a fifteen-minute sailing.

Historically, the island was used as a base for the fishing industry, first by Norwegians and Swedes, and then by Icelanders, and by the late nineteenth century it housed a herring salting factory. Overfishing in Icelandic waters led to a steep decline in the fishing industry in the 1960s, and the last fish freezing plant on Hrísey, owned by the Eyjafjörður Co-operative Society, closed in 1999.

More recently, Hrísey has developed a reputation as a birdwatching destination. There are no natural predators on the island, making it an ideal bird sanctuary. The northern part of Hrísey, Ystabæjarland, is a privately owned nature reserve, and the killing of birds is forbidden on the rest of the island. Among the forty species of bird on the island are the ptarmigan, Arctic tern, and eider duck.

References

External links 
Accommodation in Hrisey
A short guide to the islands of Eyjafjörður

Islands of Iceland